12 Classics is the sixth studio album by Bryn Haworth released in 1981 and is a compilation of songs previously released on two of his earlier albums.

Track listing

References 

1981 compilation albums
Bryn Haworth compilation albums